Arnaud Durandeau (born January 14, 1999) is a Canadian professional ice hockey winger for the  New York Islanders of the National Hockey League (NHL). He was selected in the sixth round, 165th overall, by the Islanders in the 2017 NHL Entry Draft.

Playing career

Junior
Durandeau started his junior career in 2015 with the Halifax Mooseheads of the Quebec Major Junior Hockey League (QMJHL). He was selected by the New York Islanders in the sixth round, 165th overall, of the 2017 NHL Entry Draft.

Professional
Following his four-year major junior career in the QMJHL, Durandeau was signed by the Islanders to a three-year, entry-level contract on May 31, 2019. In his first professional season, Durandeau split the 2019–20 season with the Islanders affiliates, the Bridgeport Sound Tigers of the American Hockey League (AHL) and the Worcester Railers of the ECHL.

Before the 2022–23 season, Durandeau was signed to a two-year, two-way contract extension by the Islanders. He was recalled from the AHL and made his NHL debut with the Islanders on February 20, 2023, against the Pittsburgh Penguins.

Career statistics

Regular season and playoffs

International

References

External links
 

1999 births
Living people
Bridgeport Islanders players
Bridgeport Sound Tigers players
Halifax Mooseheads players
New York Islanders draft picks
New York Islanders players
Worcester Railers players